Liu Qi (born November 3, 1942 in Wujin, Changzhou, Jiangsu) is a retired Chinese politician. He formerly served as the Communist Party Secretary of Beijing, and also a member of the Politburo of the Chinese Communist Party. He was also the President of the Beijing 2008 Olympics Organizing Committee.

Biography and career
 Graduated from Beijing 101 Middle School and the metallurgical department of the Beijing Institute of Iron and Steel Engineering, and majored in iron smelting. With a postgraduate education, Liu holds the professional title of senior engineer.
 Mayor of Beijing, 1999-2003. He was succeeded by Meng Xuenong, who was replaced by Wang Qishan after the SARS outbreak.
 Head of the Beijing 2008 Olympic Games Bid Committee (BOBICO).
 Named as one 100 most influential people of 2007 by Time magazine.
 Head of the Beijing Organizing Committee for the Olympic Games for the 2008 Summer Olympic Games.

Subject of human rights litigation
On February 7, 2002, Liu was sued in the United States District Court for the Northern District of California by the San Francisco-based human rights organization, the Center for Justice and Accountability. The plaintiffs in that case alleged that, as mayor of Beijing, Liu was responsible for formulating security policy and had control over the local police.  The police were in turn alleged to have tortured the plaintiffs with beatings, electric shock, and forced feedings through tubes inserted through the plaintiffs' noses. The court issued a declaratory judgment that Liu was responsible for violating the defendants' rights to be free from torture and arbitrary detention. However, because Liu did not defend the suit, there were no hearings, trials, or findings of fact on the issues presented.

References

External links
China Vitae biography

1942 births
Living people
Chinese Communist Party politicians from Jiangsu
Mayors of Beijing
Politicians from Changzhou
2008 Summer Olympics
Presidents of the Organising Committees for the Olympic Games
Recipients of the Olympic Order
People's Republic of China politicians from Jiangsu
Members of the 17th Politburo of the Chinese Communist Party
Members of the 16th Politburo of the Chinese Communist Party
Sportspeople from Changzhou